Trott Park is a suburb in the south of Adelaide, South Australia. It has a population of 3,503 people (2016 Census).

It is surrounded in most part by open space: the O'Halloran Hill Recreation Park, and Roseworthy Park, a former CSIRO landhold. It is also bordered by Sheidow Park, Hallett Cove and O'Halloran Hill. The Onkaparinga TAFE and Southern Expressway are situated close to the suburb.

The Coast to Vines rail trail passes through the suburb.

Trott Park is in the City of Marion local government area, the South Australian House of Assembly electoral district of Black and the Australian House of Representatives Division of Kingston.

History

Walking and Cycling Trails
The Coast to Vines rail trail passes through the suburb. Heading south the trail finishes at Marino and heading north the trail finishes at Willunga.

See also
 List of Adelaide suburbs

References

Suburbs of Adelaide